TBC1 domain family member 9 is a protein that in humans is encoded by the TBC1D9 gene.

References

Further reading

EF-hand-containing proteins